Lethargy was an American technical death metal / mathcore band formed in Rochester, New York in 1992 and active until 1999. Their last performance was on Christmas night of 1999. Drummer Brann Dailor and guitarist Bill Kelliher would later appear in Today Is the Day and Mastodon. Guitarist and vocalist Erik Burke is currently active in Nuclear Assault, Sulaco, Kalibas, Brutal Truth, and B.C.T. (Blatant Crap Taste).

Members

Last-known lineup
Erik Burke − lead guitar, vocals
Brann Dailor − drums
Bill Kelliher − guitar (1994–1999)
Adam Routier − bass

Former members
Stephan Nedwetzky − lead guitar (1992−1993)
Brian Steltz − guitar (1993−1994)

Discography

Demos
Lost in This Existence (1993)
Tainted (1994)
Humor Me, You Funny Little Man (The Red Tape) (1995)

Studio albums
It's Hard to Write with a Little Hand (1996)

Compilation albums
Discography '93–'99 (2000)

Splits
Lethargy / Big Hair 7" (1994)

References

External links
Lethargy discography at Discogs

Musical groups established in 1992
Musical groups disestablished in 1999
American progressive metal musical groups
American technical death metal musical groups
Death metal musical groups from New York (state)